UFC Fight Night: Gane vs. Volkov  (also known as UFC Fight Night 190, UFC on ESPN+ 48 and UFC Vegas 30) was a mixed martial arts event produced by the Ultimate Fighting Championship that took place on June 26, 2021 at the UFC Apex facility in Enterprise, Nevada, part of the Las Vegas Metropolitan Area, United States.

Background 
A heavyweight bout between Ciryl Gane and former Bellator Heavyweight World Champion Alexander Volkov served as the event's headliner.

A middleweight bout between Anthony Hernandez and Punahele Soriano was expected to take place at the event. The pairing was previously scheduled to take place in May 2020 at UFC on ESPN: Overeem vs. Harris, but Soriano pulled out due to undisclosed reasons. In turn, Hernandez pulled out in late May due to a hand injury and was replaced by Brendan Allen, with the new matchup expected to take place a month later at UFC Fight Night: Sandhagen vs. Dillashaw.

A lightweight bout between Yancy Medeiros and Damir Hadžović has been rescheduled for the second time and took place at the event. The pairing was first scheduled to meet at UFC Fight Night: Font vs. Garbrandt. However, it was pulled from the card just hours before taking place due to health issues with Hadžović.

A women's bantamweight bout between Julija Stoliarenko and Julia Avila was also rescheduled to take place at this event. The bout was previously scheduled to take place in March at UFC on ESPN: Brunson vs. Holland, but it was cancelled as Stoliarenko was deemed medically unfit to compete due to complications from her weight cut, including collapse twice off the scale during the her attempts.

Ed Herman was expected to face Danilo Marques in a light heavyweight bout at the event. However, Herman was removed from the card due to undisclosed reasons on June 14 and replaced by Kennedy Nzechukwu.

A welterweight bout between Nicolas Dalby and Sergey Khandozhko was expected to take place at the event. However on June 15, Khandozhko pulled out due to injury and was replaced by Tim Means.

Ramazan Emeev was expected to face The Ultimate Fighter: Brazil 3 middleweight winner Warlley Alves in a welterweight bout. However, Emeev pulled out in mid June due to undisclosed reasons and was replaced by promotional newcomer Jeremiah Wells.

A light heavyweight bout between former interim UFC Light Heavyweight Championship challenger Ovince Saint Preux and Maxim Grishin was expected to take place at the event. However, Grishin withdrew from the bout due to visa issues and was replaced by Tanner Boser in a heavyweight bout.

A flyweight bout between former UFC Flyweight Championship challenger Tim Elliott (also The Ultimate Fighter: Tournament of Champions flyweight winner) and Su Mudaerji was scheduled for this event. However, Mudaerji pulled out due to a knee injury that will require surgery and the bout was scrapped.

Results

Bonus awards
The following fighters received $50,000 bonuses.
 Fight of the Night: Timur Valiev vs. Raoni Barcelos
 Performance of the Night: Kennedy Nzechukwu and Marcin Prachnio

See also 

 List of UFC events
 List of current UFC fighters
 2021 in UFC

References 

UFC Fight Night
2021 in mixed martial arts
June 2021 sports events in the United States
2021 in sports in Nevada
Mixed martial arts in Las Vegas
Sports competitions in Las Vegas